The ABC was an American high wheeler automobile built by Albert Bledsoe Cole in St. Louis, Missouri, USA, from 1905 to 1910.

Known as the Autobuggy from 1906 to 1908, it was billed as "the cheapest high-grade car in America", and was available with  two-cylinder and  four-cylinder engines, friction drive, and pneumatic or solid tires. The drive system used a cone and two bevel wheels, one for forward and the other for reverse. This allowed it to reach its  top speed in either direction. Its high ground clearance made it popular in rural areas.

Later models were more conventional with two- or four-cylinder engines, but the market for high wheelers was disappearing and the company folded in 1910.

Confusingly, there was another Auto-Buggy made by Success, also of St Louis.

See also
ABC (1922 automobile).
List of defunct automobile manufacturers of the United States

References

 Georgano, G.N., "A.B.C.," in G.N. Georgano, ed., "The Complete Encyclopedia of Motorcars 1885-1968"  (Arkansas E.P. Dutton and Co., 1974), pp. 23.

Defunct motor vehicle manufacturers of the United States
1900s cars

Brass Era vehicles
Highwheeler